Alina ochroderoea is the only species in the monotypic moth genus Alina of the subfamily Lymantriinae. The genus was erected by Paul Griveaud in 1976. The species was first described by Paul Mabille in 1898. It is found on Madagascar.

References

Lymantriinae